Robert C. De Young (February 22, 1924 – February 15, 2011), was a politician in the American state of Florida. He served in the Florida House of Representatives from 1966 to 1968, representing the 79th district.

References

1924 births
2011 deaths
Members of the Florida House of Representatives
University of Northern Colorado alumni